The 2010 Western Bulldogs season was the club's 85th since their introduction to the VFL/AFL in 1925. The club made, but lost, the preliminary final for the third consecutive season.

NAB Cup and Premiership Season Results
2010 NAB Cup

2010 Home And Away Season 

2010 Finals Series

Ladder

See also 
 2010 AFL season
 2010 AFL Grand Final
 Western Bulldogs season 2009

References

All games by season:2010

Western Bulldogs
2010
Western Bulldogs